Base Line is a small community in Pulaski County, Arkansas, United States. Base Line is located in Southwest Little Rock.

Neighborhoods in Arkansas
Populated places in Pulaski County, Arkansas